Schmiehbach is a small river of Hesse, Germany. It flows into the Liederbach near Liederbach am Taunus.

See also
List of rivers of Hesse

Rivers of Hesse
Rivers of the Taunus
Rivers of Germany